The term Byzantine commonwealth was coined by 20th-century historian Dimitri Obolensky to refer to the area where Byzantine general influence (Byzantine liturgical and cultural tradition) was spread during the Middle Ages by the Byzantine Empire and its missionaries. This area covers approximately the modern-day countries of Greece, Cyprus, North Macedonia, Bulgaria, Serbia, Montenegro, Romania, Moldova, Ukraine, Belarus, southwestern Russia, and Georgia (known as the region of Eastern Orthodoxy in Europe or the Orthodox civilization). According to Anthony Kaldellis, the Byzantines in generally did not have a ecumenical outlook, nor did they think about the notion of a panorthodox commonwealth, which he describes as "Roman chauvinism".

The Obolensky model 

The most important treatment of the concept is a study by Dimitri Obolensky, The Byzantine Commonwealth. In his book Six Byzantine Portraits he examined the life and works of six persons mentioned in The Byzantine Commonwealth. He also described the commonwealth as the international community within the sphere of authority of the Byzantine emperor, bound by the same profession of Orthodox Christianity, and accepting the principles of Romano-Byzantine law.

There are scholars, however, who criticize this conceptualization, disputing the notion of an unchallenged superiority of the Byzantine empire. It is argued that the complex and multi-faceted dynamics of documented cultural exchange was not aligned with the theory that Constantinople was the superior core while those in periphery understood their marginal position and merely imitated their superiors. Instead of Byzantine commonwealth, historian Christian Raffensperger, proposed that it be recast as the "Byzantine ideal". Bulgaria was a constant and powerful rival to the Byzantine empire during the Middle Ages. Here, the empire maintains its belief in the traditional hierarchy and the imperial authority while its reach and sway were already considerably diminished.

See also
Byzantinism
Byzantine culture
Eastern Orthodox Church
Eastern Orthodoxy by country
Rum Millet
Succession of the Roman Empire

References

Sources

Further reading
Billinis, Alexander. The Eagle Has Two Faces: Journeys Through Byzantine Europe. AuthorHouse Publishing, 2011. .

Meyendorff, John (1983), The Byzantine Legacy in the Orthodox Church. St Vladimir's Seminary Press, .

Foreign relations of the Byzantine Empire
Commonwealth
Cultural regions
Eastern Orthodox ecumenical and interfaith relations